{{Speciesbox
| image = Atropoides-nummifer.jpg
| status = LC
| status_system = IUCN3.1
| genus = Metlapilcoatlus
| species = nummifer
| authority = (Rüppell, 1845)
| range_map = Atropoides nummifer distribution.png
| synonyms = 
 Atropos nummifer Rüppell, 1845
 T[rigonocephalus]. nummifer – Jan, 1859
 T[eleuraspis]. nummifer – Cope, 1860
 B[othrops]. nummifer – Jan, 1863
 Th[anotos]. nummifer – Posada Arango, 1889
 Th[anotophis]. nummifer – Posada Arango, 1889
 Bothriechis nummifera – Günther, 1895
 Lachesis nummifer – Boulenger, 1896
 Lachesis nummifera – Boettger, 1898
 Trimeresurus nummifer – Mocquard, 1909
 Bothriochis mammifera Recinos, 1913 (ex errore)
 Bothrops nummifera – March, 1929
 T[rimeresurus]. n[ummifer]. nummifer – Dunn, 1939
 Bothrops nummifer nummifer – Burger, 1950
 Bothrops nummifer veraecrusis Burger, 1950
 Porthidium nummifer – Campbell & Lamar, 1989
 Atropoides nummifer – Werman, 1992
}}Metlapilcoatlus nummifer, commonly known as Mexican jumping pitviper or jumping viper, is a venomous pit viper species endemic to Mexico. 

Description
The snout is rounded with a sharp canthus.

At midbody there are 23-27 rows of dorsal scales that are strongly keeled, tubercular in large specimens. The ventral scales are 121-135, while the subcaudals are 26-36 and mostly single. The eye is separated from the labial scales by 3-4 rows of small scales.

The color pattern consists of a tan, light brown or gray ground color that is overlaid with a series of around 20 dark brown or black rhomboid blotches. The lower tips of these blotches often connect with spots on the flanks to form narrow crossbands. The top of the head is dark with oblique postorbital stripes, below which the side of the head is a lighter color. The belly is whitish, occasionally with dark brown blotches.

These snakes have sometimes been mistaken for young bushmasters (Lachesis muta), but can easily be identified by their lack of a specialized tail tip.

Geographic range
Found in eastern Mexico from San Luis Potosí southeastward on the Atlantic versant and lowlands. Found in various types of forest, including cloud forest and rain forest at  altitude. The type originally lacked locality information, but apparently "Mexico" was filled in some time later. A restriction to Teapa, Tabasco, Mexico, was proposed by Burger (1950). Metlapilcoatlus mexicanus and Metlapilcoatlus occiduus were both formerly considered subspecies.

Conservation status
This species is classified as Least Concern (LC) on the IUCN Red List of Threatened Species (v3.1, 2001). Species are listed as such due to their wide distribution, presumed large population, or because it is unlikely to be declining fast enough to qualify for listing in a more threatened category. The population trend is stable. Year assessed: 2007.

References

Further reading
 Rüppell, E. 1845. Verzeichnis der in dem Museum der Senckenbergischen naturforschenden Gesellschaft aufgestellten Sammlungen. Dritte Abteilung: Amphibien. Mus. Senckenbergianum 3 (3): 293-316. (Atropos nummifer'')

External links

 

nummifer
Endemic reptiles of Mexico
Reptiles described in 1845
Venomous snakes
Fauna of the Sierra Madre Oriental
Fauna of the Sierra Madre de Oaxaca